Elections for the London Borough of Merton were held on 4 May 2006. This was on the same day as other local elections in England.

The Conservatives became the largest party in Merton, forming a minority administration. The incumbent Labour majority administration was defeated.

Results 
The Conservatives gained five seats, becoming the largest party in Merton and defeating the incumbent majority Labour administration. However, the Conservatives fell one seat short of a majority, so they established a minority administration under no overall control.

The Merton Park Ward Residents' Association maintained its three councillors in Merton Park.

In terms of seat changes, the Conservatives gained three councillors from Labour in Abbey and one each from Labour in the wards of Dundonald and Trinity.

|}

Results by Ward

Abbey

Cannon Hill

Colliers Wood

Cricket Green

Dundonald

Figge's Marsh

Graveney

Hillside

Lavender Fields

Longthornton

Lower Morden

Merton Park

Pollards Hill

Ravensbury

Raynes Park

St Helier

Trinity

Village

West Barnes

Wimbledon Park

References

Council elections in the London Borough of Merton
2006 London Borough council elections
May 2006 events in the United Kingdom